Gökhan Budak (1968 – 26 January 2013) was a Turkish professor of quantum physics. He was the Rector of Bayburt University from 7 September 2012 to his death.

Biography 
Gökhan Budak was born in Olur, Erzurum. He graduated first in his year with a B.S. degree from Ankara University Faculty of Language, History and Geography in 1989. He started his academic career as a research assistant in 1990. He became an assistant professor (yardımcı doçent) in 1996, an associate professor (doçent) in 2000 and a full professor in 2006.

He committed suicide by cutting his wrists and jumping from balcony of his house on 26 January 2013. His funeral was held at both Bayburt University and Olur Merkez Mosque, and buried in Olur Cemetery on 27 January 2013.

References

External links
Official website 

1968 births
2013 deaths
People from Erzurum
Academic staff of Atatürk University
Ankara University alumni
Turkish physicists
Quantum physicists
Turkish academic administrators
Suicides by jumping in Turkey
Suicides by sharp instrument in Turkey